The Antwerp Premetro is a network consisting of lines 2, 3, 5, 6, 8, 9, 10 and 15 of the Antwerp Tram system. It is a metre gauge system which runs underground in the city centre and further out on surface lines, which are mostly separated from motor vehicle traffic. The network is operated by De Lijn.

History

The network was planned at the beginning of the 1970s to become a fully underground network similar to the Brussels Metro or German Stadtbahnen (light railways), with a length of 15 km and comprising 22 stations. However, due to financial difficulties, only 18 stations have been built and six of those are still unused.

The first 1.3 km section opened on 25 May 1975 between Opera and Groenplaats, including station Meir. This line was extended to reach Diamant and Plantin in 1980 and Van Eeden in 1990. A north-eastern branch was opened in 1996, including the stations Sport, Schijnpoort, Handel, Elisabeth and Astrid, connecting to the existing line between Opera and Diamant.

In the original plan a second axis was proposed from the south-western suburbs via Opera and Astrid to the eastern district Deurne. A metro tunnel was built under the Turnhoutsebaan in Borgerhout, as well as some shorter tunnels, as a part of these plans. However, construction stopped in the 1980s due to lack of funds. Although the tunnel itself was largely completed, the stations still had to be decorated and the track still had to be laid. Under the Pegasus plan (approved in 2004) it was decided to finally open this unused premetro tunnel, although, to reduce the costs of the project, it was decided only to open Zegel station. The stations Carnot, Drink, College and Morckhoven were not opened, but fitted to be used as emergency exits. This axis was opened partially in 2015.

A second entrance from Deurne Turnhoutsebaan towards the "Reuzenpijp"-tunnel under Borgerhout was opened in September 2017. Underground station Foorplein remains unused.

A tunnel linking Schijnpoort on the first axis with Carnot on the second one is still not in use.

Current situation

Stations 

The network consists of 19 stations, of which 12 are currently in use. Of the remaining 7, 4 are scheduled to be put in service while 3 remain unused in all plans.
 Astrid (partly opened in 1996, fully opened in 2015, connecting with the Central station)
 Diamant (opened in 1980, also connecting with the Central station)
 Elisabeth (opened in 1996)
 Groenplaats (opened in 1975)
 Handel (opened in 1996)
 Meir (opened in 1975)
 Opera (reopened)
 Plantin (opened in 1980)
 Schijnpoort (opened in 1996)
 Sport (opened in 1996)
 Van Eeden (the only station on the left bank of the river Scheldt, opened in 1990)
 Zegel (opened in 2015)
 Carnot (not in use)
 Drink (planned open 2026)
 Collegelaan (planned open 2026)
 Morckhoven (not in use)
 Foorplein (not in use)
 Sint-Willibrordus (planned open 2027)
 Stuivenberg (planned open 2027)

The stations Astrid and Opera were originally only partly opened, both having unused platforms inaccessible to travellers. However, the unused platforms on the −1 level in Astrid station were opened on 18 April 2015 as a part of the opening of the eastern premetro axis (the Reuzenpijp). In 2016, works have started on the renovation and extension of Opera station, as part of the Noorderlijn project. The unused platforms were put into use upon completion of the renovation and the construction of a premetro entrance on the Leien just south of the station.

Lines
 2: Hoboken – Southern branch of axis 1 – Northern branch of axis 1 – Merksem
 3: Zwijndrecht – Eastern branch of axis 1 – Northern branch of axis 1 – Merksem
 5: Linkeroever – Eastern branch of axis 1 – Northern branch of axis 1 – Wijnegem
 6: Olympiade – Southern branch of axis 1 – Northern branch of axis 1 – Luchtbal
 8: Wommelgem – axis 2 – Astrid
 9: Linkeroever – Eastern branch of axis 1 – Southern branch of axis 1 – Eksterlaar
 10: Wijnegem – axis 2 – Hoboken
 15: Linkeroever – Eastern branch of axis 1 – Southern branch of axis 1 – Boechout

Future
Underground station Foorplein will probably only remain used as an emergency exit.

In September 2021, 60 million euros in funding was earmarked to open the unused tunnel under Kerk & Pothoekstraats. Two intermittent stations along this route at Stuivenberg and Willibrod are planned. Additionally, two intermittent stations along the Turnhoutsbahn (which currently are bypassed as a quasi-express service on lines 8 & 10) will be opened at Drink & College. It has not yet been announced how service will be modified by the new stations/tunnel. The target opening is 2024.

See also
 Trams in Antwerp
 Tram route 3 (Antwerp)
 List of premetro systems
 Lists of rapid transit systems

References

External links
 De Lijn – official site
 Antwerpen (premetro) at UrbanRail.net
 Photos from the Premetro in 2009

Tram transport in Belgium
Rapid transit in Belgium
Public transport in Antwerp
Rail transport in Antwerp